Candidates associated with the 2020 Democratic Party presidential primaries for the 2020 United States presidential election:

Major candidates
Candidates who are on the ballot in a minimum of fifteen states.   former Vice President Joe Biden became the presumptive presidential nominee by amassing enough delegates to secure the nomination. The nomination was made official at the 2020 Democratic National Convention in Milwaukee, Wisconsin.

Nominee

Withdrew during the primaries
Candidates who were major candidates who withdrew or suspended their campaigns after the Iowa caucuses or succeeding primary elections.

Withdrew before Iowa caucuses but remained on ballots
Candidates who withdrew too late to remove their names from several state ballots and remained on at least two:

Withdrew without appearing on primary ballots 
Candidates who were major candidates who withdrew or suspended their campaigns before the 2020 Democratic primary elections began and are not on the ballot for the presidential primaries anywhere.

Other candidates

On the ballot in at least one state
Over 1,200 people filed with the FEC declaring that they were candidates; however, very few actually made the effort to get their names on the ballot anywhere. The following persons were listed on at least one primary ballot:

Mosie Boyd, Arkansas  Total votes: 2,062
Steve Burke, New York Total votes: 252
Nathan Bloxham, Utah Total votes: 69
Jason Evritte Dunlap, Maryland Total votes: 12
Michael A. Ellinger, California Total votes: 3,634
Roque De La Fuente III‡, California Total votes: 13,584
Ben Gleib, California Total votes: 31
Mark Stewart Greenstein, Connecticut  Total votes: 3,330
Henry Hewes, New York  Total votes: 315
Tom Koos, California Total votes:  72
Zoilo Adalia, California  Total votes: 14,489 (switched to Desert Green Party)
Lorenz Kraus, New York Total votes: 52
Rita Krichevsky, New Jersey Total votes: 468
Raymond Michael Moroz, New York Total votes: 8
David Lee Rice, West Virginia  Total votes: 15,470
Sam Sloan, New York Total votes: 34
David John Thistle, Massachusetts Total votes: 53
Thomas James Torgesen, New York Total votes: 30
Robby Wells, Georgia Total votes: 1,960

‡Roque De La Fuente III is the son of perennial candidate Rocky De La Fuente and is not the same individual.

Not on the ballot anywhere 
The following individuals who did not meet the criteria to become major candidates either formally terminated their campaigns or did not attempt to get on the ballot in a single contest:
 Harry Braun, renewable energy consultant and researcher; Democratic nominee for U.S. representative from AZ-01 in 1984 and 1986
 Ami Horowitz, conservative activist and documentary filmmaker (endorsed Trump)
 Brian Moore, activist; Green nominee for U.S. Senate from Florida in 2006; Socialist and Liberty Union nominee for president in 2008
 Ken Nwadike Jr., documentary filmmaker, motivational speaker, and peace activist
 Scott Walker, Republican nominee for Delaware's at-large congressional district in 2018

Declined to be candidates 

These individuals had been the subject of presidential speculation, but publicly denied or recanted interest in running for president.

 Stacey Abrams, former Georgia state representative; Democratic nominee for governor of Georgia in 2018 (endorsed Biden)
 Michael Avenatti, attorney from California (endorsed Biden)
 Tammy Baldwin, U.S. senator from Wisconsin
 Richard Blumenthal, U.S. Senator from Connecticut since 2011
 Jerry Brown, former governor of California (Endorsed Biden)
 Sherrod Brown, U.S. senator from Ohio (Endorsed Biden)
 Cheri Bustos, U.S. Representative from Illinois since 2013, former journalist and health executive
 Bob Casey Jr., U.S. senator from Pennsylvania (endorsed Biden)
 Lincoln Chafee, Governor of Rhode Island 2011–2015; U.S. Senator 1999–2007; candidate for President in 2016
 Chelsea Clinton, First Daughter of the United States 1993–2001
 Hillary Clinton, former secretary of State, former U.S. senator from New York, former first lady of the United States, presidential candidate in 2008, Democratic nominee for president in 2016 (endorsed Biden)
 George Clooney, actor, filmmaker, activist, businessman, and philanthropist from Kentucky
 Tim Cook, business executive, industrial engineer, and developer from California
 Stephen Colbert, comedian, television host, actor, and writer; candidate for President in 2008
 Roy Cooper, Governor of North Carolina (running for re-election)
 Mark Cuban, businessman, investor, author, television personality, and philanthropist from Texas
 Andrew Cuomo, Governor of New York (endorsed Biden)
 Mark Dayton, former Governor of Minnesota
 Howard Dean, former Governor of Vermont, former DNC Chair
 Jamie Dimon, business executive from Illinois
 John Bel Edwards, Governor of Louisiana since 2016
 Rahm Emanuel, former mayor of Chicago, former White House Chief of Staff
 Russ Feingold, Former Senator from Wisconsin
 Al Franken, former U.S. senator from Minnesota
 Eric Garcetti, Mayor of Los Angeles, California (endorsed Biden)
 Andrew Gillum, former mayor of Tallahassee, Florida; Democratic nominee for governor of Florida in 2018
 Al Gore, former vice president of the United States; former U.S. senator from Tennessee; Democratic nominee for president in 2000 (endorsed Biden)
 Luis Gutiérrez, former U.S. representative from Illinois
 Eric Holder, former United States attorney general
 Bob Iger, chairman and CEO of The Walt Disney Company
 Dwayne Johnson, actor and former professional wrestler
 Doug Jones, U.S. Senator from Alabama since 2018
 Tim Kaine, U.S. senator from Virginia; former governor of Virginia; Democratic nominee for vice president in 2016 (endorsed Biden)
 Jason Kander, Secretary of State of Missouri 2013–2017; Democratic nominee for the U.S. Senate in 2016
 John Kasich, former Governor of Ohio, former Representative from Ohio's 12th congressional district, 2016 Republican presidential candidate
 Caroline Kennedy, U.S. Ambassador to Japan 2013–2017
 Joe Kennedy III, U.S. representative from Massachusetts(running for U.S. Senate) (endorsed Warren (candidate withdrawn))
 John Kerry, former secretary of State; former U.S. senator from Massachusetts; Democratic presidential nominee in 2004 (endorsed Biden)
 Mitch Landrieu, former mayor of New Orleans; former lieutenant governor of Louisiana
 Sean Patrick Maloney, United States Representative for New York's 18th congressional district
 Terry McAuliffe, former governor of Virginia (endorsed Biden)
 William H. McRaven, United States Navy Admiral 1977–2014
 Jeff Merkley, U.S. senator from Oregon (running for re-election)
 Chris Murphy, U.S. senator from Connecticut
 Phil Murphy, Governor of New Jersey (endorsed Booker (candidate withdrawn))
 Gavin Newsom, Governor of California (endorsed Harris (candidate withdrawn))
 Michelle Obama, former first lady of the United States from Illinois
 Martin O'Malley, former governor of Maryland; candidate for President in 2016 (endorsed O'Rourke (candidate withdrawn), then Biden) Ron Perlman, actor
 Gina Raimondo, Governor of Rhode Island (endorsed Bloomberg (candidate withdrawn), then Biden)
 Joe Sanberg, entrepreneur and investor from California (endorsed Sanders) Joe Scarborough, talk show host; former Republican U.S. representative from Florida
 Adam Schiff, U.S. representative from California (running for re-election) Howard Schultz, former CEO of Starbucks from Washington
 Jon Tester, U.S. senator from Montana (endorsed Bullock (candidate withdrawn)) Richard Vague, businessperson, venture capitalist, author, and Secretary of Banking and Securities of Pennsylvania
 Mark Warner, U.S senator from Virginia former Governor of Virginia (running for re-election)
 Maxine Waters, U.S. representative from California (running for re-election)''
 Jim Webb, Former Senator from Virginia, former 2016 Democratic Candidate
 Frederica Wilson, U.S. Representative from Florida since 2011
 Oprah Winfrey, television host and network executive from California
 Mark Zuckerberg, technology executive from California

See also 
 2020 Republican Party presidential candidates
 2020 Libertarian Party presidential candidates
 2020 Green Party presidential candidates
 2020 Constitution Party presidential candidates
 2020 Minor party and independent presidential candidates
 Timeline of the 2020 United States presidential election
Political positions of the 2020 Democratic Party presidential primary candidates

Notes

References

2019 in American politics
Candidates
Political timelines of the 2020s by year